Wafaa El-Sadr is a Columbia University Professor and the director of ICAP at Columbia University, Columbia World Projects and the Center for Infectious Disease Epidemiologic Research (CIDER) at Columbia Mailman School of Public Health.

Education 
El-Sadr holds a medical degree from Cairo University, Egypt, a master's of public health degree in epidemiology from the Columbia Mailman School of Public Health, and a master's in public administration degree from the John F. Kennedy School of Government at Harvard University. She is Board certified in internal medicine and infectious diseases.

MD, 1974, Cairo University
MPH, 1991, Columbia University
MPA, 1996, Harvard University Kennedy School

Career and accomplishments 
From 1988 to 2008, El-Sadr led the Division of Infectious Diseases at Harlem Hospital Center, where she helped develop HIV/AIDS and tuberculosis (TB) program. She has led a number of research studies and grant-funded programs through funding from the National Institutes of Health, U.S. Centers for Disease Control and Prevention, U.S. Agency for International Development, Health Resources and Services Administration, New York State and New York City Departments of Health as well as private foundations.

Working with former dean of the Columbia University Mailman School of Public Health Allan Rosenfield, El-Sadr helped establish the MTCT-Plus initiative, a global program that aims to provide women and their families with HIV-related services. ICAP covers 13 countries in sub-Saharan Africa.

In 2011, she has focused her efforts on highlighting the continued impact of HIV in the United States, establishing the Domestic Prevention Working Group within the NIH-funded HIV Prevention Trials Network.

In 2008, El-Sadr was named a John D. and Catherine T. MacArthur Foundation Fellow. In 2009, Rolling Stone magazine named El-Sadr in its list of "100 People Who Are Changing America." In the same year, she was also named as one of Scientific American 10: Guiding Science for Humanity. She is also a member of the Institute of Medicine of the National Academies. In November 2009, The Utne Reader named El-Sadr one of the "50 Visionaries Who Are Changing Your World."

El-Sadr is a member of the science planning committees for the International AIDS Society conference in Vienna (2010) and the Conference on Retroviruses and Opportunistic Infections (CROI, 2010). She is currently a member of the Technical Advisory Group on Tuberculosis for the World Health Organization and a board member for the Population Council. She has served as a member of the Antiviral Advisory Committee for the U.S. Food and Drug Administration, and the Advisory Council for the Elimination of TB at the U.S. Centers for Disease Control and Prevention. She also has served on the amfAR board. She is a fellow of the Infectious Diseases Society of America and previously chaired its tuberculosis committee. In 2021, she became the director of Columbia World Projects at Columbia University.

Selected publications 

 Wafaa M El-Sadr, Jessica Justman. 2020. Africa in the Path of Covid-19. N Engl J Med; 383(3):e11. doi: 10.1056/NEJMp2008193.
 Wafaa M El-Sadr, Katherine Harripersaud, Miriam Rabkin. 2017. Reaching global HIV/AIDS goals: What got us here, won't get us there. PLoS Med; 14(11):e1002421. doi: 10.1371/journal.pmed.1002421.
 Roger I Glass, Wafaa El-Sadr, Eric Goosby, Linda E Kupfer. 2019. The HIV response and global health. Lancet; 393(10182):1696. doi: 10.1016/S0140-6736(19)30353-8.
 Wafaa M El-Sadr. 2020. What one pandemic can teach us in facing another. AIDS; 34(12):1757-1759. doi: 10.1097/QAD.0000000000002636.

References

External links
Columbia Bio
2008 MacArthur Fellow: Wafaa El-Sadr
Dr. Wafaa El-Sadr on U.S. Coronavirus Response (C-SPAN)

Columbia University Mailman School of Public Health alumni
Columbia University Mailman School of Public Health faculty
MacArthur Fellows
Fellows of the African Academy of Sciences
HIV/AIDS researchers
Living people
1950 births
Egyptian infectious disease physicians
Harvard Kennedy School alumni
Cairo University alumni
Members of the National Academy of Medicine
Fellows of the Infectious Diseases Society of America